Tania Lorraine Woodbury (born 6 July 1964) is a New Zealand former cricketer who played as a left-arm medium bowler. She appeared in two Test matches for New Zealand in 1992. She played domestic cricket for Auckland and Canterbury.

References

External links

1964 births
Living people
Cricketers from Lower Hutt
New Zealand women cricketers
New Zealand women Test cricketers
Auckland Hearts cricketers
Canterbury Magicians cricketers